is the 11th single from Ayaka. It was released on April 22, 2009. It peaked at 6 on the Oricon Charts.

Overview
Featuring two songs, "Yume o Mikata ni" and "Koi Kogarete Mita Yume", the single includes a live version of "Kimi ga Iru Kara" that was recorded from her live performance in February at Shibuya-AX. "Yume o Mikata ni" is a part of the Benesse promotion campaigns, used to cheer high school students on in their studies.

The single comes in two different versions, Limited and Regular. Limited comes with a bonus sticker.

This is Ayaka's third double A-side single, after her second released back in March 2008, "Te o Tsunagō/Ai o Utaō".

Koi Kogarete Mita Yume is featured as the closing credit soundtrack for Cross Game (クロスゲーム), an anime on the TV Tokyo Network.

Track listing

References
"Yume wo Mikata ni / Koi Kogarete Mita Yume" @ CDJapan

2009 singles
2009 songs
Ayaka songs
Songs written by Ayaka
Warner Records singles
Anime songs
RIAJ Digital Track Chart number-one singles